This is a list of flag bearers who have represented Oman at the Olympics.

Flag bearers carry the national flag of their country at the opening ceremony of the Olympic Games.

See also
Oman at the Olympics

References

Oman at the Olympics
Oman
Olympic flagbearers
Olympic flagbearers